The SOFAR channel (short for sound fixing and ranging channel), or deep sound channel (DSC), is a horizontal layer of water in the ocean at which depth the speed of sound is at its minimum. The SOFAR channel acts as a waveguide for sound, and low frequency sound waves within the channel may travel thousands of miles before dissipating. An example was reception of coded signals generated by the Navy chartered ocean surveillance vessel Cory Chouest off Heard Island, located in the southern Indian Ocean (between Africa, Australia and Antarctica), by hydrophones in portions of all five major ocean basins and as distant as the North Atlantic and North Pacific.

This phenomenon is an important factor in ocean surveillance. The deep sound channel was discovered and described independently by Maurice Ewing and J. Lamar Worzel  at Columbia University  and Leonid Brekhovskikh at the Lebedev Physics Institute in the 1940s.

Principle 

Temperature is the dominant factor in determining the speed of sound in the ocean. In areas of higher temperatures (e.g. near the ocean surface), there is higher sound speed. Temperature decreases with depth, with sound speed decreasing accordingly until temperature becomes stable and pressure becomes the dominant factor. The axis of the SOFAR channel lies at the point of minimum sound speed at a depth where pressure begins dominating temperature and sound speed increases. This point is at the bottom of the thermocline and the top of the deep isothermal layer and thus has some seasonal variance. Other acoustic ducts exist, particularly in the upper mixed layer, but the ray paths lose energy with either surface or bottom reflections. In the SOFAR channel, low frequencies, in particular, are refracted back into the duct so that energy loss is small and the sound travels thousands of miles.

Within the duct sound waves trace a path that oscillates across the SOFAR channel axis so that a single signal will have multiple arrival times with a signature of multiple pulses climaxing in a sharply defined end. That sharply defined end representing a near axial arrival path is sometimes termed the SOFAR finale and the earlier ones the SOFAR symphony. Those effects are due to the larger sound channel in which ray paths are contained between the surface and critical depth. Critical depth is the point below the sound speed minimum axis where sound speed increases to equal the maximum speed above the axis. Where bottom lies above critical depth the sound is attenuated, as is any ray path intersecting surface or bottom.

The channel axis varies most with its location reaching the surface and disappearing at high latitudes (above about 60°N or below 60°S) but with sound then traveling in a surface duct. A 1980 report by Naval Ocean Systems Center gives examples in a study of a great circle acoustic path between Perth, Australia and Bermuda with data at eight locations along the path.

Applications 
The first practical application began development during World War II when the United States Navy began experimenting and implementing the capability to locate the explosion of a SOFAR bomb used as a distress signal by downed pilots. The difference in arrival times of the source at an unknown location at known locations allowed computation of the source's general location. The arrival times form hyperbolic lines of position similar to LORAN. The reverse, detection of timed signals from known shore positions at an unknown point, allowed calculation of the position at that point. That technique was given the name of SOFAR backwards: RAFOS. RAFOS is defined in the 1962 edition of The American Practical Navigator among the hyperbolic navigation systems.

The early applications relied on fixed shore stations, often termed SOFAR stations. Several became acoustic research facilities as did the Bermuda SOFAR Station which was involved in the Perth to Bermuda experiment. The records of the Bermuda station are maintained by the Woods Hole Oceanographic Institute (WHOI). In the recent past SOFAR sources were deployed for special purposes in the RAFOS application. One such system deployed bottom moored sources off Cape Hatteras, off Bermuda and one on a seamount to send three precisely timed signals a day to provide approximately  accuracy.

The first application quickly became of intense interest to the Navy for reasons other than locating downed air crews. A Navy decision in 1949 led to studies by 1950 recommending the passive sonar potential of the SOFAR channel be exploited for the Navy's Anti-Submarine Warfare (ASW) effort. The recommendation included one that $10 million a year be spent on research and development of the system. By 1951 a test array had proven the concept and by 1952 additional stations were ordered for the Atlantic. The first major exploitation of the SOFAR channel was to ocean surveillance in a classified program that led to the Sound Surveillance System (SOSUS). That system remained classified from inception until the fixed systems were augmented by mobile arrays to become the Integrated Undersea Surveillance System with the mission and nature of the system declassified in 1991.

Earthquake monitoring through the use of SOSUS after limited civilian access was granted to the Pacific Marine Environmental Laboratory (PMEL) of the National Oceanic and Atmospheric Administration in 1991 revealed ten times the number of offshore earthquakes with better localization than with land-based sensors. The SOSUS detection could sense earthquakes at about magnitude two rather than magnitude four. The system detected seafloor spreading and magma events in the Juan de Fuca Ridge in time for research vessels to investigate. As a result of that success, PMEL developed its own hydrophones for deployment worldwide to be suspended in the SOFAR channel by a float and anchor system.

Other applications
 Comprehensive Nuclear-Test-Ban Treaty Organization (CTBTO) - International Monitoring System (IMS)
 Missile Impact Location System (MILS): System to localize impact and location of test missile nose cones
 Ocean acoustic tomography: A technique to measure ocean temperatures and currents by the time delay of sounds between two distant instruments
 Project Mogul, based on the conjectured existence of a similar channel in the upper atmosphere
 Search for Malaysia Airlines Flight 370: Sounds carried by the SOFAR channel were analyzed to determine if they detected a possible ocean impact of a passenger jet that disappeared in the Southern Indian Ocean

In nature 
Mysterious low-frequency sounds, attributed to fin whales (Balaenoptera physalus), are a common occurrence in the channel. Scientists believe fin whales may dive down to this channel and sing to communicate with other fin whales many kilometers away.

Popular culture 

The novel The Hunt for Red October describes the use of the SOFAR channel in submarine detection.

Footnotes

See also 
 Bathythermograph
 RAFOS float
 Sofar bomb
 Sound Surveillance System (SOSUS)
 Underwater acoustics

References

External links 
 The SOFAR or deep sound channel, from NOAA
 How is sound used to study undersea earthquakes? (Recording of the March 11, 2011 Honshu, Japan earthquake recorded at a hydrophone located near the Aleutian Islands)
 A sound pipeline, from the National Academy of Sciences
 SOSUS, the "Secret Weapon" of Underwater Surveillance by Edward C. Whitman. Undersea Warfare
 Richard Muller, UC Berkeley – lecture on waves, SOFAR and the Roswell UFO Incident

Acoustics
Anti-submarine warfare
Navigation
Oceanography
Sonar